This is a list of notable people who bear the name Paswan. There is also an Indian caste that uses the name and Surname.

Politicians

Elected to the Lok Sabha
Chhedi Paswan, represented the Chenari constituency in Bihar
Chirag Paswan, president of Lok Janshakti Party, represented the Jamui constituency in Bihar
Kamlesh Paswan, represented the Bansgaon constituency of Uttar Pradesh
Kedar Paswan, represented the Rosera constituency in Bihar
Pitambar Paswan, represented the Rosera constituency in Bihar
Ram Bhagat Paswan, represented the Rosera constituency in Bihar
Ram Chandra Paswan, represented the Samastipur constituency of Bihar 
Subhawati Paswan, represented the Bansgaon constituency of Uttar Pradesh
Sukdeo Paswan, representing the Araria constituency of Bihar
Upendra Paswan, represented Bakhri constituency in Bihar 
Virchandra Paswan, represented the Nawada constituency of Bihar

Elected to the Rajya Sabha
Brahmadev Anand Paswan, represented the Janata Dal party in Bihar

Member of the Bihar Legislative Assembly
Janardan Paswan, also member of the Jharkhand Legislative Assembly
Lalan Paswan, represented the Chenari constituency
Bilat Paswan Vihangam, writer, represented the Rajnagar constituency, Padma Shri Awardee
Ram Prit Paswan, represented the Rajnagar constituency
Sanjay Paswan, represented the Nawada constituency, former Minister of state of Human Resource Development

Member of the Uttar Pradesh Legislative Assembly
Kalpnath Paswan, represented the Mehnagar constituency 
Krishna Paswan, represented the Khaga constituency
Vimlesh Paswan, represented the Bansgaon constituency

Other
Bhola Paswan Shastri, Freedom Fighter, Former Chief Minister of Bihar State 
Kameshwar Paswan, leader of the BJP, former minister for welfare in Government of Bihar
Ram Vilas Paswan, Former Cabinet Minister of Consumer Affairs, Food and Public Distribution, Padma Bhushan Awardee
Suresh Paswan, former minister in Government of Jharkhand headed by Hemant Soren

Paswan